Fran Morelli (January 15, 1939 – September 10, 2008) was an American football tackle. He played for the New York Titans in 1961.

He died on September 10, 2008, in New Jersey at age 69.

References

1939 births
2008 deaths
American football tackles
Colgate Raiders football players
New York Jets players